Rakthamillatha Manushyan is a 1979 Indian Malayalam film,  directed by Jeassy and produced by J. J.  Kuttikkad. The film stars Soman, Jayabharathi, Adoor Bhasi, Jose and Manavalan Joseph in the lead roles. The film has musical score by M. K. Arjunan.

Cast
M. G. Soman as Sivan
Jayabharathi as Rukmini
Adoor Bhasi as Ramalinga Chettiyar
Jose as Baby
Manavalan Joseph as Antrayose
Kanchana as Yamuna
Meena as Sumathi's mother
Vidhubala as Sophie
Veeran as Sumathi's father
Shubha as Sumathi
Sankaradi as Appayya/Mathai
Sukumari as Kamala Ambal
Jose Prakash as Menon

Soundtrack
The music was composed by M. K. Arjunan and the lyrics were written by Sathyan Anthikkad.

References

External links
 

1979 films
1970s Malayalam-language films